5-Benzyloxytryptamine (5-BT), is a tryptamine derivative which acts as an agonist at the 5-HT1D, 5-HT2 and 5-HT6 serotonin receptors, and an antagonist of TRPM8.

Legality
5-Benzyloxytryptamine is illegal in Singapore.

See also 
 5-Carboxamidotryptamine
 5-Methoxytryptamine
 BW-723C86
 Sumatriptan

References 

5-HT6 agonists
Serotonin receptor agonists
Tryptamines
Indole ethers at the benzene ring